William Miller  (February 12, 1835 – February 23, 1912) was a Canadian politician.

Born in Antigonish, Nova Scotia, the son of Charles Miller and Elizabeth Smith, he was educated at the Antigonish Academy, studied law and was called the bar of Nova Scotia in 1860. He set up practice in Arichat.

In 1863, he was elected as a Reformer to the Legislative Assembly of Nova Scotia representing the Cape Breton riding of Richmond County. In 1867, at the age of 32, he was summoned to the Senate of Canada representing the senatorial division of Richmond, Nova Scotia. He was the youngest person ever summoned to the Canadian Senate. From 1883 to 1887, he was the Speaker of the Senate of Canada. In 1871, Miller married Annie Cochran. He served until his death in 1912.

References

External links
 
 Speakers of the Senate biography
 Marble, A.E. Nova Scotians at home and abroad: biographical sketches of over six hundred native born Nova Scotians (1977) p. 300 

1835 births
1912 deaths
Nova Scotia Reformer MLAs
Members of the King's Privy Council for Canada
Speakers of the Senate of Canada
Canadian senators from Nova Scotia